Burketown Airport  is an airport located  southwest of Burketown, Queensland, Australia.

Airlines and destinations

See also
 List of airports in Queensland

References

Airports in Queensland
North West Queensland